Măguri-Răcătău is a commune in Cluj County, Transylvania, Romania. It is composed of three villages: Măguri (Szamosfő), Măguri-Răcătău and Muntele Rece (Hideghavas).

Demographics 
According to the census from 2002 there was a total population of 2,411 people living in this commune. Of this population, 99.83% are ethnic Romanians,  0.08% are ethnic Hungarians and 0.04% ethnic Germans.

References

Atlasul localităților județului Cluj (Cluj County Localities Atlas), Suncart Publishing House, Cluj-Napoca, 

Communes in Cluj County
Localities in Transylvania